Daniel Robles López (born 10 February 1947) is a Peruvian politician and a former Congressman representing La Libertad for two terms from 2001 to 2011. Robles belongs to the Peruvian Aprista Party. He first ran for a seat in Congress in the 2000 elections, under the Peruvian Aprista Party, but he was not elected, attaining a low share of votes as the party only gained 5 seats. He was first elected in the 2001 elections representing La Libertad and was re-elected in the 2006 elections. He did not run for re-election in the 2011 elections and retired from politics.

External links

 Official Congressional Site

1947 births
Living people
American Popular Revolutionary Alliance politicians
Members of the Congress of the Republic of Peru

Place of birth missing (living people)